Winkworth plc is an international estate agent listed on the AIM London Stock Exchange.

History 
Winkworth was founded in 1835 by the brothers Henry St John and Edward Henry Thomas Winkworth. The original head office was on Curzon Street, Mayfair, with a country office in Brighton.

Winkworth went public on the AIM London Stock Exchange in 2009, when it had 89 franchises in Great Britain, France and Portugal. By 2016, it had expanded into the Spanish market, with an office in Marbella on the Costa del Sol.

Its chief executive officer is Dominic Agace.

References

External links 

Property companies based in London
Real estate companies established in 1835
British companies established in 1835
1835 establishments in England
Property services companies of the United Kingdom